This list of alumni of Aix-Marseille University includes notable graduates and non-graduate former students of Aix-Marseille University, Aix-en-Provence/Marseille, France.

Nobel laureates
 
 René Cassin – winner of the 1968 Nobel Peace Prize 
 J. M. G. Le Clézio – winner of the 2008 Nobel Prize in Literature
 Frédéric Mistral – winner of the 1904 Nobel Prize in Literature

Politics and government

Heads of state and government

Foreign politicians 
 

 

 Mohamed Abbou – Minister-Delegate for Industry, Trade, Investment and the Digital Economy of Morocco: 2013–2016; member of the House of Representatives of Morocco: 1997–2011 
 Nassirou Bako Arifari – Minister of Foreign Affairs of Benin: 2011–2015
 Lucie Milebou Aubusson – President of the Senate of Gabon: 2015–present 
 Nizar Baraka – Minister of Economy and Finance of Morocco: 2012–2013; president of the CESE (Social, Economic & Environmental Council): 2013–present  
 Simone Beissel – Member of the Chamber of Deputies of Luxembourg: 1999–2004/2013–present
 Driss Benzekri – Moroccan left-wing political and human rights activist
 Albert Borschette – European Commissioner for Competition: 1970–1976; Luxembourgian European Commissioner: 1970–1976
 Jacques Bouiti – Minister of Health of the Republic of the Congo: 1968–1970
 Brian Campion – American politician, member of the Vermont House of Representatives
 Pascal Chabi Kao – Beninese politician
 Adolfo Costa du Rels – President of the Council of the League of Nations: 1940–1946; Minister of Foreign Affairs of Bolivia: 1948; Bolivian Ambassador to France: 1948–1952
 Francis Covi – President of the National Assembly of Benin: 1959–1960; Member of the National Assembly of Benin: 1960–1963
 Piotr Czauderna – Member of the National Development Council of Poland: 2015–present 
 Nigel Davies – Member of the UK Parliament for Epping: 1950–1951 
 Henriette Diabaté – Minister of Culture of Ivory Coast: 1990–1993/2000; Minister of Justice of Ivory Coast: 2003–2005
 Mohamed Ould El Abed – Minister for Economic Affairs and Development of Mauritania: 2005–2007
 Aziz El Houssine – Minister of Civil Service and Administrative Reform of Morocco 
 Joëlle Elvinger – Member of the Chamber of Deputies of Luxembourg: 2013–2019 
 Jean-François Ferrari – Member of the National Assembly of Seychelles: 2016–2020; Designated Minister and Minister of Fisheries of Seychelles: 2020–present 
 Thomas Galbraith, 2nd Baron Strathclyde – Leader of the House of Lords and Chancellor of the Duchy of Lancaster: 2010–2013 
 Tiémoko Marc Garango – Minister of Finance of Burkina Faso: 1966–1976
 Hermann Höcherl – Minister of the Interior of Germany: 1961–1965; Minister of Food, Agriculture and Consumer Protection of Germany: 1965-1969
 Idriss Azami Al Idrissi – Moroccan politician of the Justice and Development Party, Minister-Delegate for the Budget in the cabinet of Abdelilah Benkirane
 Mamadou Koulibaly – President of the National Assembly of Côte d'Ivoire: 2001–2012
 Abdou Labo – Minister of Defense of Nigeria: 1994–1995; Minister of Equipment of Nigeria: 2000–2002; Minister of State for Sports and Culture of Nigeria: 2002–2004; Minister of State for Hydraulics of Nigeria: 2004–2007; Minister of State for the Interior of Nigeria: 2011–2013; Minister of State for Agriculture of Nigeria: 2013–2014
 Luzolo Bambi Lessa – Minister of Justice of the Democratic Republic of the Congo: 2008–2012
 Penda Mbow – Minister of Culture of Senegal: 2001
 Mattea Meyer – Member of the Swiss National Council: 2015–2019/2019–present 
 Kunio Mikuriya – Secretary General of the World Customs Organization (WCO): 2009–present 
 Federica Mogherini – Minister of Foreign Affairs of Italy: Feb–Oct 2014; High Representative of the Union for Foreign Affairs and Security Policy and Vice-President of the European Commission: 2014–2019   
 Benoît Pelletier – Minister of Canadian Intergovernmental Affairs: 2003–2008; Leader of the Government in Parliament: 2007–2008
 Josué Pierre-Louis – Minister of Justice of Haiti: Oct–Nov 2011
 Saraha Georget Rabeharisoa – Malagasy politician and president of the Madagascar Green Party
 Césaire Rabenoro – Minister of Foreign Affairs of Madagascar: 1991–1993
 Daniel Rajakoba – Malagasy politician, founder of the Fihavanantsika party 
 Roy Reding – Member of the Chamber of Deputies of Luxembourg: 2013–present
 Martine Reicherts – Director-General of DG Education and Culture (DG EAC): 2015–present 
 Manuela Rottmann – Member of the Bundestag: 2017–present 
 Amor Rourou – Minister of Industry, Energy and Mines of Tunisia: 1979–1980
 Johnson Roussety – former Chief Commissioner of Rodrigues, Mauritius
 Nicolas Schmit – European Commissioner for Jobs and Social Rights: 2019–present; Minister of Labour, Employment and Immigration of Luxembourg: 2013–2018
 Iain Sproat – Minister for Sport and Tourism (UK): 1993–1997; Member of Parliament for Harwich: 1992–1997; Member of Parliament for Aberdeen South: 1970–1983
 René Steichen – European Commissioner for Agriculture & Rural Development: 1992–1995; Luxembourgian European Commissioner: 1992–1995
 Jorge Telerman – Argentine politician and journalist, the 4th Chief of Government of Buenos Aires City
 Roland Theis – General Secretary of the Christian Democrat Union in Saarland, Germany
 Erik Ullenhag – Minister of Integration of Sweden: 2010–2014; Leader of the Liberal People's Party in the Swedish Riksdag: 2014–2016
 Fátima Veiga – Minister of Foreign Affairs of Cape Verde: 2002–2004
 Victorine Gboko Wodié – Minister for Human Rights of Ivory Coast: 2003–2005

French politicians

 Benjamin Abram – Mayor of Aix-en-Provence: 1888–1896
 Yann Aguila – Councillor of State of France: 1990–2010
 Rene Arthaud – Minister of Health of France: Jun–Dec 1946
 Antoine Aude – Mayor of Aix-en-Provence: 1835–1848
 Félix Baret – Mayor of Marseille: 1887–1892  
 Jacques Barrot – Member of the Constitutional Council of France: 2010–2014; Vice-President of the European Commission: 2004–2010; European Commissioner for Justice, Fundamental Rights and Citizenship: 2008–2010; European Commissioner for Transport: 2004–2008; Minister of Social Affairs of France: 1995–1997; Minister of Health of France: 1979–1981; Minister of Commerce and Industry of France: 1978–1979
 Victor Barthélemy – French political activist
 Jassuda Bédarrides – Mayor of Aix-en-Provence: 1848–1849 
 Joseph Cabassol – Mayor of Aix-en-Provence: 1902–1908
 Christophe Castaner – Minister of the Interior of France: 2018–2020 
 Adolphe Crémieux – Minister of Justice of France: Feb–Jun 1848; 1870–1871
 Thomas Degos – Prefect of Mayotte: 2011–2013  
 Blaise Diagne – French politician who was the first black African elected to the French Chamber of Deputies, and the first to hold a position in the French government  
 Charles Giraud – Minister of National Education of France/Minister of Public Worship of France: Jan–Apr/Oct–Dec 1851
 Louis Gros – Member of the Constitutional Council of France: 1977–1984  
 Élisabeth Guigou – Minister of Justice of France: 1997–2000; Minister of Social Affairs of France: 2000–2002 
 Olivier Henrard – Member of the Council of State of France: 2015–2019
 Alain Joissains – Mayor of Aix-en-Provence: 1978–1983
 Christine Lagarde – President of the European Central Bank (ECB): 2019–present; Managing Director of the International Monetary Fund (IMF): 2011–2019; Minister of the Economy, Industry and Employment of France: 2007–2011; Minister of Agriculture of France: May–Jun 2007
 Pascal Lalle – Director of Active Services at the Central Directorate of Public Security of France (DCSP): 2012–2019 
 Émile Lisbonne – Minister of Health of France: Oct–Nov 1933; Jan–Feb 1934
 Charles-Marie Livon – Mayor of Marseille: 1895 
 Marceau Long – Vice President of the Council of State of France: 1987–1995 
 Léon Martinaud-Déplat – Minister of the Interior of France: 1953–1954; Minister of Justice of France: 1952–1953 
 Philippe Massoni – Head of the Paris Police Prefecture: 1993–2001; Representative of the French Co-Prince of Andorra: 2002–2007
 Jean-François Mattei – Minister of Health of France: 2002–2004 
 Pierre Moitessier – Director of the National Police of France: 1936–1938; Councillor of State of France: 1938–1944  
 Jules Joseph Onfroy – Mayor of Marseille: 1861–1862   
 Germaine Poinso-Chapuis – Minister of Health of France: 1947–1948 
 Brune Poirson – Secretary of State to the Minister for the Ecological and Inclusive Transition: 2017–2020 
 Georges Ripert – Secretary of State for Public Instruction and Youth of France: Sep–Dec 1940 
 Michèle Rubirola – Mayor of Marseille: Jul–Dec 2020 
 Bernard Squarcini – Head of the General Directorate for Internal Security of France: 2008–2012
 Patrick Subrémon – French civil servant and prefect 
 Jean-Guy Talamoni – President of the Corsican Assembly: 2015–2021 
 Joseph Thierry – Minister of Public Works of France: Mar–Dec 1913; Minister of Finance of France: Mar–Sep 1917
 Dominique Vian – French overseas departments administrator

Members of the National Assembly of France
 

 Bérangère Abba – Deputy: 2017–2020    
 Henri Aiguier – Deputy: 1919–1924 
 Franck Allisio – Deputy: 2022–present
 Étienne Antonelli – Deputy: 1924–1932
 Emmanuel Arène – Deputy: 1881–1885/1886–1889/1889–1893/1893–1898/1898–1902/1902–1904 
 Avi Assouly – Deputy: 2012–2014
 Olivier Audibert-Troin – Deputy: 2012–2017
 Charles Jean Marie Barbaroux – Deputy: 1792–1794 
 Charles Ogé Barbaroux – Deputy: 1849–1851 
 Gabriel Baron – Deputy: 1897–1898/1902–1906/1906–1910  
 Jean-Pierre Bechter – Deputy: 1978–1981/1986–1988 
 Joseph Elzéar Dominique Bernardi – Deputy: Apr–Sep 1797  
 Roland Blum – Deputy: 1988–1993/1993–1997/1997–2002/2002–2007/2007–2012 
 Adéodat Boissard – Deputy: 1919–1924
 Alfred Borriglione – Deputy: 1876–1894  
 Auguste Bouge – Deputy: 1889–1919
 Valérie Boyer – Deputy: 2007–2012/2012–2017/2017–2020
 Marine Brenier – Deputy: 2016–2022 
 Albert Castelnau – Deputy: 1871–1876/1876–1877
 Raymond Cayol – Deputy: 1946–1951
 Pascal Ceccaldi – Deputy: 1906–1918
 André Cellard – Deputy: 1978–1981
 Émilie Chalas – Deputy: 2017–2022 
 Jean-Baptiste-Amable Chanot – Deputy: 1910–1914 
 Jules Charles-Roux – Deputy: 1889–1898
 Jean-David Ciot – Deputy: 2012–2017
 Alexandre Clapier – Deputy: 1846–1848/1871–1876 
 Daniel Colin – Deputy: 1986–1997
 Jean-Michel Couve – Deputy: 1988–1993/1993–1997/1997–2002/2002–2007/2007–2012/2012–2017 
 Olivier Darrason – Deputy: 1993–1997
 Gustave Delestrac – Deputy: 1898–1902  
 Alfred Donadei – Deputy: 1906–1914
 Jean Dufour – Deputy: 2001–2002
 Philippe Dunoyer – Deputy: 2017–2022/2022–present 
 M'jid El Guerrab – Deputy: 2017–2022 
 Toussaint-Bernard Émeric-David – Deputy: 1809–1815 
 Joseph Floret – Deputy: 1842–1846
 Gustave Fourment – Deputy: 1910–1919 
 Thadée Gabrielli – Deputy: 1902–1906
 Sauveur Gandolfi-Scheit – Deputy: 2007–2012/2012–2017
 Alphonse Gent – Deputy: Jun–Dec 1848/1871–1881  
 Bruno Gilles – Deputy: 2002–2007 
 Hubert Giraud – Deputy: 1919–1924
 René Hostache – Deputy: 1958–1962
 Maryse Joissains-Masini – Deputy: 2002–2007/2007–2012 
 Sébastien Jumel – Deputy: 2017–2022/2022–present 
 Bertrand Kern – Deputy: 1998–2002  
 Christian Kert – Deputy: 1988–1993/1993–1997/1997–2002/2002–2007/2007–2012/2012–2017
 Gustave de Laboulie – Deputy: 1834–1837/1848–1851 
 Mohamed Laqhila – Deputy: 2017–2022/2022–present  
 Jean Leonetti – Deputy: 1997–2011/2012–2017
 Alexandra Louis – Deputy: 2017–2022
 Arthur Malausséna – Deputy: 1892–1893/1894–1898
 Richard Mallié – Deputy: 2002–2007/2007–2012
 Charles Marchal – Deputy: 1898–1902 
 Antoine Maure – Deputy: 1902–1906 
 Patrick Mennucci – Deputy: 2012–2017
 Isidore Méritan – Deputy: 1919–1924
 Paul François Morucci – Deputy: 1919–1924 
 Patrick Ollier – President of the National Assembly of France: Mar–Jun 2007; Vice-President of the National Assembly of France: 1998–2002; Deputy: 1988–2002/2002–2010/2012–2017
 Pierre Pascallon – Deputy: 1986–1988/1993–1997
 Claude-Emmanuel de Pastoret – President of the National Legislative Assembly of France: Oct 1791; President of the Council of Five Hundred: Aug–Sep 1796; Deputy: 1791–1792/1795–1797
 Rodolphe Pesce – Deputy: 1978–1988  
 Michel Pezet – Deputy: 1986–1988/1988–1993 
 Pierre Marie Pietri – Deputy: 1848–1849
 Jean Joseph François Poujoulat – Deputy: 1849–1851
 Patrice Prat – Deputy: 2012–2017 
 Louis Puy – Deputy: 1951–1958 
 François Juste Marie Raynouard – Deputy: 1805–1814/1814–1815 
 Simon Renucci – Deputy: 2002–2007/2007–2012
 Joseph-François Reste – Deputy: 1945–1946 
 René Ribière – Deputy: 1958–1962/1967–1978 
 Jean-Baptiste Ripert – Deputy: 1902–1906
 Honoré Gabriel Riqueti, comte de Mirabeau – President of the National Constituent Assembly of France: Jan–Feb 1791; Deputy: 1789–1791
 Didier Robert – Deputy: 2007–2010
 Laurianne Rossi – Deputy: 2017–2022
 Philippe Séguin – President of the National Assembly of France: 1993–1997; Vice-President of the National Assembly of France: 1981–1986; Deputy: 1978–1986/1988–2002 
 Martial Sicard – Deputy: 1895–1902
 Dominique Tian – Deputy: 2002–2007/2007–2012/2012–2017
 Xavier Vallat – Deputy: 1919–1924/1928–1940
 Souad Zitouni – Deputy: 2020–2022

Members of the Senate of France

 Félix Anglès – Senator: 1891–1897
 Jean-Baptiste Blanc – Senator: 2020–present  
 Roger Carcassonne – Senator: 1959–1971 
 Lionel Cherrier – Senator: 1974–1983
 Nassimah Dindar – Senator: 2017–present
 Jean-Yves Dusserre – Senator: Oct–Dec 2014 
 Vincent Farinole – Senator: 1894–1903
 Michel Fontaine – Senator: 2011–2017 
 Jean Francou – Senator: 1971–1989 
 Francis Giraud – Senator: 1998–2008 
 Adrien Gouteyron – Senator: 1978–2011
 Pierre Amédée Jaubert – Peer: 1841–1847
 Sophie Joissains – Senator: 2008–2020 
 Philippe Kaltenbach – Senator: 2011–2017 
 Roger Karoutchi – First Vice-President of the Senate of France: 2020–present; Senator: 1999–2007/Jul 2009/2011–present
 Michel Laugier – Senator: 2017–present
 Jean-Étienne-Marie Portalis – President of the Senate of France: Jun–Jul 1796; Senator: 1795–1797
 Richard Tuheiava – Senator: 2008–2014
 Robert Vigouroux – Senator: 1989–1998

Members of the European Parliament
 Mathilde Androuët – MEP: 2019–present 
 Marie-Arlette Carlotti – MEP: 1996–2009
 Gilbert Collard – MEP: 2019–present
 Antoinette Fouque – MEP: 1994–1999 
 Sylvie Goulard – MEP: 2009–2017 
 Jan Keller – MEP: 2014–2019
 Jean-Charles Marchiani – MEP: 1999–2004
 Joëlle Mélin – MEP: 2014–2022

Diplomatic service

 Laurence Auer – French Ambassador to North Macedonia: 2012–2016; French Ambassador to Romania: 2020–present 
 Félix de Beaujour – French Ambassador to the United States: 1804  
 Alphonse Berns – Ambassador of Luxembourg to the United States: 1991–1998; Permanent Representative of Luxembourg to the UN: 2002–2005; ambassador of Luxembourg to Belgium: 2005–2011; Permanent Representative of Luxembourg to NATO: 2005–2011; ambassador of Luxembourg to the UK: 2011–2013
 Emmanuel Bonne – French Ambassador to Lebanon: 2015–2017
 Zouheir Chokr – Lebanese Ambassador to Qatar: 1994–1999
 Jürgen Chrobog – German Ambassador to the United States: 1995–2001
 Roland Eng – Cambodian Ambassador to the United States: 2000–2005 
 Paul Faber – ambassador of Luxembourg to Portugal: 1993–1998; ambassador of Luxembourg to Italy: 1998–2002; ambassador of Luxembourg to Austria: 2002–2005; ambassador of Luxembourg to Switzerland: 2005–2007
 Francois Gordon – British ambassador to Algeria: 1996–1999; British ambassador to the Ivory Coast: 2001–2004; British high commissioner to Uganda: 2005–2008
 Cherif Guellal – Algerian Ambassador to the United States: 1963–1967 
 Rolf Kaiser – German ambassador to the Republic of Cyprus: 2005–2008
 Kenneth H. Merten – United States Ambassador to Haiti: 2009–2012; United States Ambassador to Croatia: 2012–2015
 Alain de Muyser – ambassador of Luxembourg to Portugal: 2004–2010; ambassador of Luxembourg to Cape Verde: 2006–2010; Deputy Secretary General of the General Secretariat of the Benelux Union: 2010–present 
 Dag Halvor Nylander – Norwegian diplomat
 Christophe Penot – French ambassador to Australia: 2017–2020
 Théodore Roustan – Residents-General in Tunisia: 1881–1882; French ambassador to the United States: 1882–1891; French ambassador to Spain: 1891–1894 
 Walter Jürgen Schmid – German ambassador to the Russian Federation: 2005–2010; German ambassador to the Holy See: 2010–2011; German ambassador to the Republic of Guinea: 1992–1994

Lawyers, judges, and legal academics

 Peter Annis – Judge of the Federal Court of Canada: 2013–present
 Henri Bernard – French lawyer and judge 
 Marta Cartabia – President of the Constitutional Court of Italy: 2019–2020; Minister of Justice of Italy: 2021–2022 
 Suzanne Challe – First President of the Court of Appeal of Nîmes: 1978–1991
 Hubert Charles – President of the Supreme Court of Monaco: 2007–2012
 Gaston Crémieux – French lawyer, journalist and writer
 Mircea Criste – Prosecutor General of Romania: 1998–2001
 Albin Curet – First President of the Court of Appeal of Chambéry: 1906–1912; Adviser to the Court of Cassation of France: 1912–1919 
 Charles Debbasch – French academic and jurist
 Tony Downes – the Deputy Vice-Chancellor and professor of law of the University of Reading
 Kimberly Marteau Emerson – American attorney, advocate and civic leader
 Myriam Ezratty – Director of the Prison Administration Directorate: 1983–1986; First President of the Court of Appeal of Paris: 1988–1996 
 Charles Annibal Fabrot – French jurisconsult 
 Jean-Pierre Gibert – French canon lawyer
 Claude Jorda – French jurist, former judge at the International Criminal Court (ICC)
 Jeff Kurzon – American attorney and politician  
 Marie-Madeleine Mborantsuo – President of the Constitutional Court of Gabon: 1991–present 
 Iulia Motoc – Member of the United Nations Human Rights Committee, judge of the Constitutional Court of Romania, and judge of the European Court of Human Rights (ECtHR)
 Grégoire Mourre – President of the First Civil Division of the Court of Cassation of France: 1811–1815; Chief Prosecutor of the Court of Cassation of France: 1815–1830   
 Joseph Louis Elzéar Ortolan – French jurist and former chair of Comparative Criminal Law at Sorbonne University
 Yves Rüedi – Judge of the Federal Supreme Court of Switzerland: 2014–present 
 Louis Sarrut – President of the Court of Cassation of France: 1917–1925 
 Emmanuel Tawil – French lawyer and academic
 Herdis Thorgeirsdottir – Icelandic lawyer and political scientist
 Colin Tyre, Lord Tyre – Scottish lawyer, former President of the Council of Bars and Law Societies of Europe, and a Senator of the College of Justice, a judge of the Supreme Courts of Scotland
 Albert Jan van den Berg – the Arbitration Chair at Erasmus University Rotterdam and the president of the Netherlands Arbitration Institute
 Prosper Weil – French lawyer, professor emeritus at Panthéon-Assas University, member of the Académie des sciences morales et politiques

Arts, literature, humanities, and entertainment

Entertainment

 Kiarash Anvari – Iranian film maker, video artist and script writer
 Fanny Ardant – French actress, winner of the 1997 César Award for Best Actress
 Ariane Ascaride – French actress, winner of the 1998 César Award for Best Actress
 Ishmael Bernal – Filipino film, stage and television director
 Carole Bienaimé – French film and television producer
 Robin Campillo – French screenwriter, editor and film director
 Bradley Cooper – American actor and film producer, nine-time Academy Award nominee
 Philippe Faucon – French film director, screenwriter and producer, winner of the 2016 César Awards for Best Film and Best Adaptation
 Sadaf Foroughi – Iranian film maker, video artist and film editor
 Robert Guédiguian – French film director, actor, screenwriter and producer
 Ken Hom – Chinese American chef, author and British television-show presenter
 Caroline Huppert – French film director and screenwriter, the sister of actress Isabelle Huppert
 Mylène Jampanoï – French actress
 Ariane Labed – French actress, who was awarded the Coppa Volpi for the Best Actress at the 67th Venice International Film Festival 
 Xavier Laurent – French actor
 Richard Marquand – Welsh film director
 Paul Meurisse – French actor
 Marcel Pagnol – French novelist, playwright, and filmmaker, who became the first filmmaker elected to the Académie Française
 Jean Renoir – French film director, recipient of the Academy Honorary Award, and son of the Impressionist painter Pierre-Auguste Renoir
 Richard Sammel – German actor 
 Corinne Touzet – French actress
 Jean-Louis Trintignant – French actor, winner of the Best Actor Award at the 1969 Cannes Film Festival and the 2013 César Award for Best Actor

Historians
 Xavier Accart – French historian of ideas
 Karima Dirèche – French Algerian historian specialising in the contemporary history of the Maghreb  
 Marc Fumaroli – French historian and essayist, member of the Académie française, the Académie des Inscriptions, and a foreign member of the British Academy  
 Emile Haag – Luxembourgish historian, trade unionist and former principal of the Athénée de Luxembourg
 Bernard Lugan – French historian and associate professor of African history at Jean Moulin University Lyon 3
 Antoine Pagi – French ecclesiastical historian 
 Régine Pernoud – French historian and medievalist
 Ambroise Roux-Alphéran – French historian
 Abdeljelil Temimi – Tunisian historian 
 Matthias Theodor Vogt – German historian and musicologist

Journalism
 Ali Bach Hamba – Tunisian journalist 
 Julien Benedetto – French journalist
 François Chalais – French reporter, journalist, writer and film historian
 Úna Claffey – Irish journalist and political adviser
 Jim Hoagland – American journalist, an associate editor, senior foreign correspondent and columnist for The Washington Post, and two-time recipient of the Pulitzer Prize
 Lutz Kleveman – German investigative journalist and photographer
 François Mignet – French journalist, historian, member of the Académie française and the Académie des sciences morales et politiques
 Jean-Marc Morandini – French journalist
 Terry Phillips – American journalist, author and media consultant
 David Pujadas – French journalist and television presenter

Literature
 Chris Agee – Irish poet, essayist and editor
 Jean Aicard – French poet, dramatist and novelist, member of the Académie française
 Paul Alexis – French novelist, dramatist and journalist 
 Joseph d'Arbaud – French poet
 Christophe Arleston – French comics writer and editor
 Léon de Berluc-Pérussis – French poet and historian 
 Mongo Beti – Cameroonian writer  
 Beverley Bie Brahic – American poet and translator
 Marcel Brion – French essayist, literary critic, novelist, historian, member of the Académie française
 Ashley Bryan – American writer and illustrator of children's books, winner of the Laura Ingalls Wilder Award
 Marion May Campbell – Australian novelist and academic
 Raphaël Confiant – French writer
 Ghislain de Diesbach – French writer and biographer
 Ferdinand Duviard – French writer and novelist
 Jean Echenoz – French writer
 Marian Engel – Canadian novelist
 Charles Exbrayat – French fiction writer
 José Frèches – French historical novelist
 Madeleine Gagnon – Quebec educator, literary critic and writer
 Joachim Gasquet – French author, poet, and art critic
 Sebhat Gebre-Egziabher – Ethiopian writer
 José Giovanni – French writer and film-maker  
 Pétur Gunnarsson – Icelandic writer 
 Malek Haddad – Algerian poet and writer 
 William Kreiten – German literary critic and poet
 Pierre La Mure – French author
 Abdelwahab Meddeb – an award-winning French-language poet, novelist, essayist, translator, editor, Islamic scholar, cultural critic, political commentator, radio producer, public intellectual and professor of comparative literature at Paris West University Nanterre La Défense
 Stoyan Mihaylovski – Bulgarian writer and social figure
 Denise Morel – French writer and psychiatrist
 Suzanne Prou – French novelist, winner of the 1973 Prix Renaudot 
 André de Richaud – French poet and writer
 Yvon Rivard – Canadian writer
 Boris Schreiber – French writer
 Christiane Singer – French writer, essayist and novelist
 Olga Stanisławska – Polish writer
 Patrick Süskind – German writer and screenwriter
 Pierre Torreilles – French writer, poet and editor
 Bahaa Trabelsi – Moroccan novelist
 Ira Trivedi – Indian author, columnist, and yoga Acharya
 Ana Lydia Vega – Puerto Rican writer
 Manuel Veiga – Cape Verdean writer
 Keith Waldrop – American poet, writer and translator, professor emeritus at Brown University, winner of the 2009 National Book Award for Poetry
 Rosmarie Waldrop – American poet, translator and publisher
 Choe Yun – Korean writer, winner of the 1994 Yi Sang Literary Award

Music
 
 Thierry Amiel – French singer and songwriter
 Françoise Atlan – French singer
 Paul Bastide – French conductor and composer
 Emmanuel Boyer de Fonscolombe – French composer
 Régis Campo – French composer
 Anaïs Croze – French singer
 Nick Drake – English singer-songwriter and musician
 Kungs – French DJ, record producer and musician
 Francisco Negrin – award-winning stage director working in opera
 Joseph d'Ortigue – French musicologist and critic
 Henry Padovani – French musician, noted for being the original guitarist for the Police
 Mélanie Pain – French indie pop singer
 Pierre Pradier – French classical pianist
 Jean-Pierre Rampal – French flautist
 Cécile McLorin Salvant – three-time Grammy Award-winning jazz singer
 Nicolas Vatomanga – saxophonist, flutist, bandleader and composer

Visual arts
 
 Gilles Barbier – French contemporary artist
 Paul Cézanne – French artist and Post-Impressionist painter
 Lucien Clergue – French photographer, former chairman of the Academy of Fine Arts
 Michel-François Dandré-Bardon – French history painter and etcher 
 Roger Excoffon – French graphic designer
 Xiao Ge – Chinese artist and curator
 Phoebe Gloeckner – American cartoonist, illustrator, painter, and novelist
 Jeremy Houghton – British fine artist 
 George Morrison – American landscape painter and sculptor
 Michael Reinhardt – American photographer whose images were featured in magazines such as Vogue, Harper's Bazaar and Sports Illustrated
 Haim Steinbach – American artist
 Catherine Walker – designer of Diana, Princess of Wales

Scientists and academics

 Philip Augustine – Indian gastroenterologist
 Philippe Baumard – organizational scientist who has held visiting professorships at New York University, University of California, Berkeley, Stanford University, and is currently École Polytechnique's Chair on Innovation & Regulation, and president of the Scientific Council of France's High Council for Strategic Education and Research
 Ariel Beresniak – Swiss specialist in Public Health and Health Economics
 Saviour Bernard – Maltese medical practitioner, scientist, and major philosopher
 Mounir Bouchenaki – Algerian archaeologist and director of the Arab Regional Centre for World Heritage
 Jean Boutière – French philologist
 Emmanuel Brunet Jailly – Canadian politics and public policy scholar
 Veronica Dahl – Argentine/Canadian computer scientist
 Michel Darluc – French naturalist 
 Marcelo Dascal – Israeli philosopher and linguist, professor of philosophy at Tel Aviv University
 Alexandre del Valle – Italo-French political scientist and geopolitician
 Maurice Dongier – neuropsychiatrist at the Douglas Mental Health University Institute 
 François Doumenge – French geographer
 Pierre-Michel Duffieux – French physicist, the founder of Fourier optics
 William A. Earle – American philosopher
 Mansour Mohamed El-Kikhia – Libyan academic and politician
 Pascal Engel – French philosopher, who works on the philosophy of language, philosophy of mind, epistemology and philosophy of logic
 Bruno Étienne – French sociologist and political analyst
 Arthur Fallot – French physician
 F. J. Friend-Pereira – Indian academic and author
 Roger Garaudy – French philosopher
 Pierre Joseph Garidel – French botanist
 Pierre Gassendi – French philosopher, priest, scientist, astronomer and mathematician
 Henri Gastaut – French neurologist
 Antoine Marc Gaudin – professor at the Massachusetts Institute of Technology (MIT), and a founding member of the National Academy of Engineering (NAE)
 Éric Geoffroy – French philosopher, islamologist, writer and scholar
 Paul Gourret – French zoologist
 Yang Huanming – Chinese genetics researcher, director of the Beijing Genomics Institute at the Chinese Academy of Sciences
 Fredric Jameson – American literary critic and Marxist political theorist, who has taught at Harvard and Yale 
 Eugène Jamot – French physician
 Miro Kačić – Croatian linguist  
 Henry-Louis de La Grange – musicologist and biographer of Gustav Mahler
 Saadi Lahlou – professor in social psychology at the London School of Economics (LSE)
 Janja Lalich – professor of sociology at California State University, Chico
 Thomas LaMarre – Canadian academic, author, Japanologist and member of the faculty of McGill University 
 Henri Lefebvre – French sociologist, Marxist intellectual and philosopher
 Éliane Amado Levy-Valensi – French-Israeli psychologist, psychoanalyst and philosopher
 Joseph Lieutaud – a pediatrician to the Louis XV of France's court, the personal physician to Louis XVI of France, a member of the French Academy of Sciences and of the Royal Society  
 Raphaël Liogier – French sociologist, director of the Observatoire du religieux 
 Jean-Pierre Luminet – French astrophysicist, writer and poet
 Randal Marlin – Canadian philosophy professor at Carleton University
 Jean-François Mattéi – French philosopher
 Marco Tulio Medina – Honduran neurologist and scientist
 Ferdinand Mélin-Soucramanien – President of the National Institute of Public Service: 2022–present 
 Simon Claude Mimouni – French biblical scholar
 Jean-Baptiste Morin – French mathematician, astrologer and astronomer
 Jean-Jacques Nattiez, OC, CQ, FRSC – Canadian semiotician, professor of Musicology at the Université de Montréal
 Nicola Padfield – Head of Fitzwilliam College of the University of Cambridge: 2013–2019  
 Philip M. Parker – INSEAD Chaired Professor of Management Science
 Elisabeth Pate-Cornell – specialist in engineering risk analysis, and professor of management science at Stanford University
 Lucien-Marie Pautrier – French dermatologist
 René Pomeau – French scholar, member of the Académie des Sciences Morales et Politiques
 Jean-Bernard Racine – professor of geography at the Institute of Geography, Faculty of Geosciences and Environment of the University of Lausanne (UNIL) and at HEC Lausanne Business School
 Léon Rostan – French internist, member of the Académie Nationale de Médecine, and foreign member of the Royal Swedish Academy of Sciences
 Louis Roule – French zoologist
 Laurent Sagart – director of research at the Centre de recherches linguistiques sur l'Asie orientale, unit of the Centre National de la Recherche Scientifique (CNRS)
 Enric Sala – marine ecologist and an Explorer-in-Residence at National Geographic
 Peng Shige – Chinese mathematician, member of the Chinese Academy of Sciences
 Jean-Athanase Sicard – French neurologist and radiologist
 Antônio Roberto Monteiro Simões – linguist, an associate professor at the University of Kansas
 Jacqueline Naze Tjøtta – Norwegian mathematician 
 Gustavo Uzielli – Italian geologist, historian, and scientist 
 Jean Véronis – French linguist, computer scientist and blogger
 Jane Zemiro – Australian academic and author

Business and economics

 Olivier Baussan – French businessman, the founder of L'Occitane en Provence, Oliviers & Co and Première Pression Provence 
 Sunil Benimadhu – Chief Executive of the Stock Exchange of Mauritius (SEM): 1998–present
 Philippe Bourguignon – member of the board of directors of eBay, former co-chief executive officer of the World Economic Forum (WEF)
 Pierre Falcone – French businessman, the Chairman of Pierson Capital Group
 Guillaume Faury – CEO of Airbus: 2019–present
 Jean-Marc Forneri – CEO of Rossignol: 1988–1994; Managing Partner of Banque Worms: 1994–1996; President of Credit Suisse: 1996–2004 
 Bernard Gainnier – Chairman and CEO of PwC France and Maghreb: 2013–2021 
 Christian Garin – President of Marseille-Fos Port: 2004–2008
 Gilles Grapinet – Chairman and CEO of Worldline
 Peter Hambro – founder of Peter Hambro Mining and a non-executive director of the Private Banking Division of Société Générale
 Rupert Hambro – British heir, banker, businessman and philanthropist
 Nabil Karoui – Tunisian businessman and politician
 Chips Keswick – non-executive director of DeBeers Sa, Investec Bank, Persimmon plc, Arsenal Holdings plc (the parent company of Arsenal F.C.), and former director of the Bank of England
 Angus Maddison – British economist, emeritus professor at the Faculty of Economics at the University of Groningen 
 Demetrios Mantzounis – Greek banker, chief executive officer of Alpha Bank 
 Jean-François Rischard – Vice President of the World Bank: 1998–2005
 Jens Weidmann – President of the Deutsche Bundesbank: 2011–2021; Chair of the Bank for International Settlements: 2015–2022

Sports
 Sandrine Aubert – four-time winner in Alpine Skiing World Cup
 Frédérick Bousquet – French freestyle and butterfly swimmer
 Cecile Canqueteau-Landi – French gymnastics coach and former artistic gymnast
 Mohamed Diop – Senegalese basketball player 
 Pape Diouf – President of Olympique de Marseille: 2005–2009
 Anthony Giacobazzi – French rugby union player, who plays as scrum half for RC Toulonnais
 Jean-Luc Gripond – President of FC Nantes: 2001–2005
 Jason Lamy-Chappuis – French skier, Olympic gold medallist in combined events 2010
 Alain Mosconi – French swimmer, Olympic medalist and world record holder
 Michel Nandan – Monaco-based motor sport executive

Miscellaneous
 Barry Jean Ancelet – Cajun folklorist, expert in Cajun music and Cajun French
 Isabelle Arvers – French media art curator, critic and author, specializing in video and computer games, web animation, digital cinema, retrogaming, chiptunes and machinima
 Dominique Bénard – former Deputy Secretary-General of the World Organization of the Scout Movement (WOSM) 
 Gaston Berger – French futurist, industrialist and philosopher
 James Birch – English art dealer, curator and gallery owner
 Jean-Baptiste de Brancas – Bishop of La Rochelle: 1725–1729; Archbishop of Aix-en-Provence: 1729–1770
 Paul Alphéran de Bussan – Bishop of Malta: 1728–1757
 Antoine Bruni d'Entrecasteaux – French naval officer, explorer and colonial governor
 Chucrallah-Nabil El-Hage – archeparch of the Maronite Catholic Archeparchy of Tyre: 2003–present 
 Henri Fabre – French aviator, the inventor of the first successful seaplane, Fabre Hydravion
 Christopher Fomunyoh – senior associate for Africa and regional director at the National Democratic Institute for International Affairs (NDI)
 Romain Gary – French diplomat, novelist, film director and World War II aviator
 Emmanuel Goffi – French Air Force Officer
 Cyprien Iov – French comedian and blogger
 Pascal Lalle – director of active services at the Central Directorate of Public Security: 2012–present 
 Dai Llewellyn – Welsh socialite
 Claude Njiké-Bergeret – development aid volunteer
 Jean-Michel Parasiliti di Para, Prince Antoine IV – the head of household for the Kingdom of Araucanía and Patagonia
 Nicolas-Claude Fabri de Peiresc – French astronomer, antiquary and savant
 Henri Antoine Marie Teissier – French-Algerian Catholic bishop and archbishop emeritus of Algiers  
 Nguyen Xuan Vinh – commander of Republic of Vietnam Air Force: 1958–1962

References

Aix-Marseille University alumni